PRWeek is a trade magazine for the public relations industry. The original UK edition was the brainchild of the late Geoffrey Lace who at the time worked for Haymarket. After failing to interest Haymarket in his idea he left to launch it on his own circa 1981.  Peter Gummer (now Lord Chadlington) had founded Shandwick a few years earlier in 1974 aged 31. Lace persuaded Shandwick, Dewe Rogerson and a few others to invest into PR Week. PRWeek ran on a shoe string right up until the point it was sold it back to Haymarket, his former employers, for a very large sum circa 1988. There is also a US edition, which launched in 1998, as well as a German edition. The magazine is published by the UK's largest independent publishing group, Haymarket Media Group. The US edition, which is independent from the UK edition, is published by Haymarket Media. The company has representation in Asia, via Campaign Asia-Pacific magazine.

PRWeek also produces research about the UK public relations industry including the annual ranking of Top 150 PR consultancies and Salary Survey as well as surveys into industry-relevant issues such as staff retention.

In October 2013, the UK print edition of PRWeek changed from a weekly to a monthly edition; in September 2016 it switched from monthly to being bi-monthly.

References

External links
 

Business magazines published in the United Kingdom
Monthly magazines published in the United Kingdom
Weekly magazines published in the United Kingdom
Public relations in the United Kingdom
Works about public relations
Magazines with year of establishment missing